Ilhan bin Fandi Ahmad (born 8 November 2002), more commonly known as Ilhan Fandi or mononymously as Ilhan, is a Singaporean professional footballer who plays as a forward for Belgian First Division B club Deinze and the Singapore national team.

Club career

Early career
Ilhan embarked on his quest to become a professional footballer in Europe, by enrolling in an English school to study and train. The teenager left for England on 8 September 2017 to study at the Queen Ethelburga's College in York for the next two years. Ilhan trained with the i2i Football Academy, which has links to English football club Leeds United. The academy also has partnerships with both York College and York St John University and will assist in linking up players with English professional and semi-professional clubs.

Young Lions
Ilhan signed with the Singapore Premier League club Young Lions in 2019. He made his debut in a 1-1 draw against Brunei DPMM on 7 August 2019. He became the third son of Fandi Ahmad to lace up his boots for the Young Lions – following in the footsteps of his brothers Irfan Fandi and Ikhsan Fandi. Ilhan made his first professional start in a league game at the age of 16 years and 331 days, where he scored his first goal in a 1-4 loss against Albirex Niigata Singapore on 15 August 2019.

Ilhan scored his third goal for the club in a heavy 4-1 defeat at the hands of Hougang United in the Young Lions' opening match of the 2020 Singapore Premier League season. As of April 2020, Ilhan has scored 3 goals in just 5 matches for the Young Lions.

Ilhan scored the first goal of the Young Lions' 2021 Singapore Premier League season, helping his team to a 3-3 draw against Balestier Khalsa FC. He ended the 2021 Singapore Premier League season with 7 goals in 18 league matches.

Ilhan notched 2 goals for the Young Lions before leaving for Albirex in the mid-season transfer window. In total, Ilhan has grabbed 13 goals in 33 games, a better strike rate than his older brothers, striker-turned-defender Irfan (eight in 43) and forward Ikhsan (10 in 52), managed during their time in the SPL.

Albirex Niigata (Singapore)
On 21 April 2022, Albirex Niigata (S) confirmed they had signed Ilhan for the remaining 2022 season. Ilhan signed the contract which runs until the end of the 2022 season. Ilhan made his debut on 27 May 2022 in a 8–2 win against Geylang International. His presence after coming on changed the game and he was awarded the man of the match, where he was involved in 3 of the 5 Albirex goals after coming on for 22 minutes, showing his vision, strength and composure respectively. He also assisted and scored on his debut. In his first four games for the White Swans, Ilhan has already racked up three goals. Ilhan notched his first career hat-trick in his sixth game for the club, which included an outrageous bicycle kick that opened the scoring for Albirex. He has managed 12 goals in his first 11 matches for the Japanese side. Ilhan won the 2022 Singapore Premier League title with the White Swans, with 2 games to spare, helping his team's cause by averaging almost a goal a game with 14 goals for the White Swans since his arrival at Jurong East Stadium. Ilhan was rewarded for his efforts in the season as he clinched the SPL Young Player of the Year and the Goal of the Year awards, and was also named in the SPL Team of the Year.

Deinze 
On 12 December 2022, it was announced that Ilhan had signed for Belgian First Division B club K.M.S.K. Deinze and will join up with his new team after the conclusion of the 2022 AFF Championship. However, Ilhan sustained an ACL injury in the tournament, in which he could be out of action for six to nine months.

International career
Despite being only 17, Ilhan has been invited to train with the Singapore under-22 team. Ilhan received his first senior team training session in 2021. Ilhan played in an unofficial closed-door friendly against Afghanistan on 29 May 2021. Ilhan made his official international debut and started in the second-round of the 2022 FIFA World Cup qualifiers against Palestine on 3 June 2021. On his second cap against Malaysia on 26 March 2022, Ilhan played alongside his brothers Irfan and Ikhsan. It was the first time that the three Fandi brothers played in the same match for the national team together. It was also the first time in Singapore's history to have three brothers on the pitch for the national team.

Ilhan scored his first international goal in a 3-1 win over Maldives in the final pre-tournament friendly, ahead of the 2022 AFF Championship, heading in from a Christopher van Huizen’s cross from the left for his first international goal on his fifth cap. He netted in back-to-back games for the Lions when he clinically headed in yet another Christopher van Huizen’s lovely floater for his second international goal in six caps, in a 3-2 win over Myanmar  in the Lions' opening match of the 2022 AFF Championship. After the match against Vietnam, Ilhan sustained a tear in ACL in his left knee, he is expected to be side-lined for six to nine months.

Style of play
Ilhan plays as an attacking midfielder, noted for his footwork, coordination and composure as cited by Singapore football legend, Noh Alam Shah. In the 2020 season, he was given the role as a false 9 as he "has really good technique and good reading of the game", pointed out by head coach Nazri Nasir.

Personal life
Ilhan is the third son of Singaporean footballing legend Fandi Ahmad and South African model Wendy Jacobs. His brothers, Irfan and Ikhsan, are also footballers playing for BG Pathum United. He has an older sister Iman and a younger brother Iryan who plays for Hougang United under-17.

Career statistics

Club

Young Lions are ineligible for qualification to AFC competitions in their respective leagues.

International

International goals

Honours
Albirex Niigata (Singapore)
Singapore Premier League: 2022

Individual
 Singapore Premier League Young Player of the Year: 2022
 Singapore Premier League Team of the Year: 2022
 Singapore Premier League Goal of the Year: 2022

References

External links

2002 births
Living people
Singaporean footballers
Singaporean expatriate footballers
Singapore Premier League players
Expatriate footballers in England
Singaporean people of Malay descent
Singaporean people of South African descent
Association football forwards
Association football midfielders
Young Lions FC players
Singapore youth international footballers